ZFKC-FM (89.9 FM, "Radio Cayman 1") is a radio station in the Cayman Islands. The station is owned by the Cayman Islands Government and has a news/talk format with the focus on community affairs and current events, plus blocks of music.

Radio Cayman's first broadcast was on 12 April 1976 but regular programmes did not begin until December of that year. The station's most recent licence was issued on 11 December 2003, but it was amended on 18 October 2007 to reflect the move of the main Radio Cayman 1 transmitter in Grand Cayman and its Cayman Brac translator to the same 93.9 MHz frequency.

Translators

References

External links
Radio Cayman official website

1976 establishments in the Cayman Islands
Community radio stations
News and talk radio stations
Radio stations established in 1976
Radio stations in the Cayman Islands